The Proud Twins may refer to:

Juedai Shuangjiao, a Wuxia novel by Gu Long
The Proud Twins (film), a 1979 Hong Kong film
The Proud Twins (TV series), a 2005 Hong Kong TV series